The 2016/17 FIS Ski Jumping Alpen Cup was the 27th Alpen Cup season in ski jumping for men and the 9th for ladies.

Other competitive circuits this season included the World Cup, Grand Prix, Continental Cup, FIS Cup and FIS Race.

Calendar

Men

Ladies

Standings

Men

Ladies

Ladies' Alpen Cup Tournament

References

2016 in ski jumping
2017 in ski jumping
FIS Ski Jumping Alpen Cup